Lord Londesborough may refer to:
Albert Denison, 1st Baron Londesborough (1805–1860), British politician and diplomat
His son William Denison, 1st Earl of Londesborough (1834–1900), known as the Lord Londesborough 1860–1887, British peer and Liberal politician
Baron Londesborough contains a fuller list of people